Zophodia grossulariella is a species of moth of the family Pyralidae. It is found in Europe (up to the Netherlands and England) and North America.

The wingspan is 25–36 mm. The moths are on wing from April to May depending on the location.

The larvae feed on Ribes uva-crispa.

External links 
 Microplepidoptera.nl 
 Lepidoptera of Belgium
 UKMoths

Moths described in 1809
Phycitini
Moths of Europe
Insects of Turkey